Paoay Lake (locally known as Dacquel a Danum; Ilokano: Big Water) is a lake within the municipality of Paoay, in northwestern Luzon, Philippines. It is the largest lake in the province of Ilocos Norte and one of the largest natural lakes in the area.

Historically known as Lago de Nanguyudan, the lake supposedly was the site of a prosperous barangay called San Juan de Sahagún (Saint John of Sahagún) that sank after an earthquake. The freshwater lake and its  surroundings was declared a national park in 1969 by virtue of Republic Act 5631. In 1978, through Presidential Decree 1554, the park was reduced to an area of  concentrated on the lake itself around its highest water level.

Geography
It was formed as a result of coastal progradation and the subsequent development of a sand dune barrier during the late Quaternary Period. The lake has no tributaries. Most of the lake's inflow consists of groundwater and surface runoff from surrounding hills during rainy season.

Biota
The lake is inhabited by phytoplankton, macrophytes and zooplankton which includes 8 species of copepods, 8 species of cladocerans and 11 species of rotifers. Fish recorded include tilapia, catfish and mudfish. Some aquatic plants also inhabit the lake such as water spinach, water hyacinth, tape grass and Buntót-pusà (lit. "cat's tail", Dysophylla auricularia).

On the slopes around and above the lake grow ipil-ipil, acacia, gmelina and banaba plants. The park is also home to avifauna species such as the white-collared kingfisher, brahminy kite, and Philippine duck, including some migratory birds such as the grey heron, osprey, and great egret.

Economy
Paoay Lake is one of the many tourist attractions in Ilocos Norte. Some of its most visited sights include the Malacañang ti Amianan (Malacañang of the North), a historical house museum built by the family of former president Ferdinand Marcos, the 18-hole Paoay Golf Course, and a sports complex. Also located in the vicinity are Fort Ilocandia Resort and Casino and Plaza del Norte Hotel and Convention Center. It is accessible via the Paoay Lake Road from the main highway and the Laoag–Balaccad Road from the Laoag International Airport.

Aside from tourism, small-scale aquaculture has also been introduced as livelihood of the local townsfolk residing in the area. Fish pens primarily of tilapia can be found near the shores. The lake's status as a protected area, however, enables the government to monitor and control human activity in the lake in order to prevent misuse of its resources.

See also
 List of national parks of the Philippines

References

External links
Geographic data related to Paoay Lake at OpenStreetMap

Lakes of the Philippines
Landforms of Ilocos Norte
National parks of the Philippines
Protected areas established in 1969